Henry Wahl (9 March 1915 – 13 October 1984) was a Norwegian speed skater. He competed in the 10,000 m event at the 1948 Winter Olympics, but failed to finish. He was Norwegian all-round champion in 1947.

References

External links
 

1915 births
1984 deaths
People from Hordaland
Norwegian male speed skaters
Olympic speed skaters of Norway
Speed skaters at the 1948 Winter Olympics
World Allround Speed Skating Championships medalists
Sportspeople from Vestland